Raphaël Cacérès (born 1 September 1987) is a French former professional footballer who played as a striker.

In March 2019, at the age of 31, Cacéres announced his retirement from professional football due to an injury to his big toe.

References

External links

Raphaël Cacérès profile at foot-national.com

1987 births
Living people
People from Carpentras
Sportspeople from Vaucluse
French footballers
Association football forwards
FC Rouen players
Montluçon Football players
Luzenac AP players
Dijon FCO players
ES Troyes AC players
AC Arlésien players
S.V. Zulte Waregem players
FC Sochaux-Montbéliard players
Ligue 1 players
Ligue 2 players
Belgian Pro League players
French expatriate footballers
Expatriate footballers in Belgium
Footballers from Provence-Alpes-Côte d'Azur